Bits of Naaz is the debut extended play by Dutch-Kurdish singer Naaz, released on 20 April 2018 by Universal Music Group. Preceded by the singles "Words", "Can't", "Up to Something", and "Loving Love", the extended play delves into topics of acceptance and love. Naaz, at the time a teenager, recorded the extended play in her bedroom.

Background 
Naaz first received media attention in 2014, after she auditioned on Holland's Got Talent. After being eliminated from the show, she was featured on the Yellow Claw songs "Feel It" and "Catch Me". In 2016, she released her debut single, "Sadboy".

Composition

Recording 
Because Naaz's parents did not want her going to the studio without her brother, she wrote, produced, and recorded most of the songs on Bits of Naaz in her bedroom. She used a Yamaha keyboard and a laptop to create the songs. Because Naaz was inexperienced, and did not know how to play instruments well, she borrowed sounds from the environment around her and used them in the extended play. The song "As Fun" was recorded in a studio that used to be Adolf Hitler's airport. Naaz noted that "they turned what used to be a really dark place into something that rather shines light, as it’s now a spot for creatives and a shelter for refugees".

Music and lyrics 

Naaz took inspiration from American rapper Kanye West when producing the songs on Bits of Naaz, and was inspired by Chance the Rapper while writing the album. In an interview, James Cooke of Music Crowns noted that there was "a juxtaposition between the way the music sounds and the way the lyrics come across". He said that the production is happy and upbeat, but also noted that some of the lyrics are dark.

Singles 
The extended play's release was preceded by four singles. The first single, "Words", was released in May 2017. The second single from the extended play was "Can't", released in August 2017. "Can't" is described as a song that "explores a forbidden love that's romantically sentimental". The third single, "Up to Something", was released in October of the same year. The fourth and final single, "Loving Love", was released in February 2018.

Track listing

Charts

References 

2018 EPs
EPs by Dutch artists